Subdivision is an administrative unit below district level and above the block level in every state of India. A district may have one or more subdivisions. Presently there are 101 subdivisions in 38 districts of Bihar. Subdivisions are a group of blocks, which is administered by Sub-divisional Officer (SDO) also called as Sub-divisional Magistrate (SDM). SDM is similar to District Magistrate (DM) at subdivision level. They all are members of either the Indian Administrative Service (IAS) or the Bihar Administrative Service (BAS). Majority of DM and SDM in India are the members of the IAS.

At the same time, there are 853 police stations in 43 Police Districts of Bihar. Police Districts are usually headed by a Senior Superintendent of Police (SSP). A Police District is divided into Police Subdivisions, headed by a Deputy Superintendent of Police (DSP). All these Bihar Police officers are either a member of Indian Police Service (IPS) or Bihar Police Service (BPS). These Police Districts are different from the above 38 administrative or revenue districts of Bihar.

List of subdivisions of Bihar

Divisions of Bihar

See also
 Government of Bihar
 Administration in Bihar
 Cities in Bihar
 Districts of Bihar
 Divisions of India 
 Blocks in Bihar
 Villages in Bihar

References

Subdivisions of Bihar
Bihar-related lists